The 1971 Sudanese coup d'état was a short-lived communist-backed coup, led by Major Hashem al Atta, one of the founding members of the free officers organization that carried out a coup two years prior, against the government of President Gaafar Nimeiry. The coup took place on 19 July 1971, toppling the government of the Democratic Republic of the Sudan, but failed to garner support either domestically or internationally. After several days Nimeiry loyalists launched a counter-coup, freeing Nimeiry and toppling Atta's government.

Following the coup Nimeiry, pushed by Defense Minister Khalid Hassan Abbas, made moves to strengthen his rule, and by the end of the year ultimate authority had transferred from the multi-member Revolutionary Command Council to the Presidency, held by Nimeiry. Over the next several years, the remaining former members of the RCC would see their authority diminished, and by 1975 all but Abu al-Gasim Mohammed Ibrahim had been forced out of government.

Background

After neutralizing the conservative opposition from the Ansar movement, the government of the Revolutionary Command Council (RCC), who had seized power in 1969, concentrated on consolidating its political organization to phase out communist participation in the government. This strategy prompted an internal debate within the Sudanese Communist Party (SCP). The orthodox wing, led by party secretary general Abd al Khaliq Mahjub, demanded a popular front government with communists participating as equal partners. The National Communist wing, on the other hand, supported cooperation with the government.

Soon after the army had crushed the Ansar at Aba Island, Nimeiri moved against the SCP. He ordered the deportation of Abd al Khaliq Mahjub. Then, when the SCP secretary general returned to Sudan illegally after several months abroad, Nimeiri placed him under house arrest. In March 1971, Nimeiri indicated that trade unions, a traditional communist stronghold, would be placed under government control. The RCC also banned communist affiliated student, women's, and professional organizations. Additionally, Nimeiri announced the planned formation of a national political movement called the Sudan Socialist Union (SSU), which would assume control of all political parties, including the SCP. After this speech, the government arrested the SCP's central committee and other leading communists.

The SCP, however, retained a covert organization that was not damaged in the sweep. Before further action could be taken against the party, the SCP launched a coup against Nimeiri. The coup occurred on 19 July 1971, when one of the plotters, Major Hisham al Atta, surprised Nimeiri and the RCC meeting in the presidential palace and seized them along with a number of pro-Nimeiri officers. Atta named a seven-member revolutionary council, in which communists ranked prominently, to serve as the national government. Three days after the coup, however, loyal army units stormed the palace, rescued Nimeiri, and arrested Atta and his confederates. Nimeiri, who blamed the SCP for the coup, ordered the arrest of hundreds of communists and dissident military officers. The government subsequently executed some of these individuals and imprisoned many others.

Events

The Siesta Coup
The coup began in the mid afternoon of 19 July, when Khartoum was relatively quiet due to many Sudanese retiring from the scorching mid afternoon sun to take a siesta. With Khartoum relatively quiet Atta moved tanks into positions around government buildings, capturing the Presidential Palace and taking Nimeiry and several dozen of his followers prisoner.

At this point Atta declared himself, Babiker Al Nour, and Farouk Osman Hamdallah in charge of the government, proclaiming a new Revolutionary Council. The three men were rumoured communists, and whilst they denied this, their new government's first act was to lift Nimeiry's ban on the Sudanese Communist Party and its various affiliated organisations. Speaking over the radio, Atta announced the new government would work in closer collaboration with communist and socialist countries, and stated that Sudanese communists would be brought into a new coalition government.

The response to the coup was initially limited, with Atta's forces receiving no opposition from either the Sudanese Armed Forces or from the wider population. Khartoum did however see communists stage pro-coup demonstrations. Whilst Atta was in Khartoum, his fellow coup leaders, Al Nour and Hamdallah, were in London, with Hamdallah having accompanied Al Nour on a trip for medical treatment. Upon being informed of the success of the coup the two wound up their affairs and prepared to fly back to Khartoum, with Al Nour being slated to serve as Chief of Staff in the new government.

The coup fails to take hold
Despite the ease at which Atta had seized Khartoum the coup had little widespread support. While the Sudanese Communist Party was the largest Communist Party in the Arab World, its support base was limited to a small section of Sudan's population. In contrast to this there was a widespread opposition in Sudan's religious and conservative population to communism, which was viewed as having dangerous links to atheism. 

Adding to this was the fact that Sudan's neighbors were also opposed to the new communist government. None of Sudan's neighbours wished to have either a communist or communist-sympathising government for a neighbor, and Anwar Sadat in Egypt ordered first a fact-finding mission to Khartoum, and later ordered Egyptian forces stationed south of Khartoum to resist the coup.

Gaddafi's Libya also supported Nimeiry. Gaddafi, like Nimeiry, had come to power two years prior. Gaddafi was also at this point virulently anti-communist. Gaddafi's response was far more extreme than Sadat's, and he dispatched two Libyan fighter jets to force down the British Airlines jetliner which was ferrying Al Nour and Hamdallah from London back to Khartoum. The plane was forced down in Libya, and the two were taken off the plane and arrested.

Saudi Arabia was also worried about the prospect of a new communist government across the Red Sea, although Saudi Arabia refrained from engaging in any clear action against the new Sudanese government. Ba'athist Iraq did however respond favorably to the new government, publicly supporting the coup, and was actually the only Arab government to do so. Baghdad dispatched an airliner to Khartoum carrying an Iraqi delegation to congratulate Atta and his new government, although this crashed under mysterious circumstances whilst crossing Saudi Arabia.

The coup unravels

Unaware that Al Nour and Hamdallah's plane had been forced down in Libya, Atta travelled to Khartoum International Airport on the morning of the 22 July expecting to welcome the two back to Sudan. Atta had realized by this point that the coup may prove more difficult than it originally appeared, and had dispatched orders to prevent any attempted countercoups; the army had been ordered to immobilise its tanks in the Khartoum area, most armored brigades and paratroopers had been put on leave, and the arms and ammunition of units whose loyalty was in doubt had been removed and locked away. According to rumours, Atta had not undertaken these courses of action alone, but had instead done so with the advice and support of Soviet military personnel.

Upon learning of the status of the plane, Atta travelled to the center of Khartoum to address a rally that he had called to welcome back Al Nour and Hamdullah. Speaking to the crowd, Atta tried desperately to muster support for his coup, but the crowd was thin, Atta was heckled, and there were calls for the return of Nimeiry.

Within hours, military units loyal to Nimeiry moved into Khartoum, engaging with units loyal to Atta and freeing Nimeiry after a short battle. Al Nour and Hamdullah were returned to Khartoum by Gaddafi, and were executed alongside Atta and a half dozen other coup leaders.

Results
Having survived the SCP-inspired coup, Nimeiri reaffirmed his commitment to establishing a socialist state. A provisional constitution, published in August 1971, described Sudan as a "socialist democracy" and provided for a presidential form of government to replace the RCC. A plebiscite the following month elected Nimeiri to a six-year term as president.

The coup brought major changes in Sudan's foreign and domestic policies. In its aftermath, leading members of the Sudanese Communist Party were executed, and several communist-dominated trade unions were banned. In his foreign policy, Nimeiry expelled East German security advisers and denounced the Soviet Union and most of its European allies for their attitude to the attempted coup.

References

Military coups in Sudan
Communism in Sudan
Communist rebellions
Coup d'état
1970s coups d'état and coup attempts
Foreign relations of the Soviet Union
Attempted coups d'état in Sudan
Arab rebellions
July 1971 events in Africa